Mahmoud Karimi may refer to:

Mahmoud Karimi (Maddah) (born 1968), Iranian religious singer
Mahmoud Karimi Sibaki (born 1978), Iranian footballer